The thick-billed murre or Brünnich's guillemot (Uria lomvia) is a bird in the auk family (Alcidae). This bird is named after the Danish zoologist Morten Thrane Brünnich. The very deeply black North Pacific subspecies Uria lomvia arra is also called Pallas' murre after its describer. The genus name is from Ancient Greek ouria, a waterbird mentioned by Athenaeus. The species term lomvia is a Swedish word for an auk or diver. The English "guillemot" is from French guillemot probably derived from Guillaume, "William". "Murre" is of uncertain origins, but may imitate the call of the common guillemot.

Murres have the highest flight cost, for their body size, of any animal.

Description

Since the extinction of the great auk in the mid-19th century, the murres are the largest living members of the Alcidae. The thick-billed murre and the closely related common guillemot (or common murre, U. aalge) are similarly sized, but the thick-billed still bests the other species in both average and maximum size. The Pacific race (U. l. arra) is larger than the Atlantic race, especially in bill dimensions.

Adult birds are black on the head, neck, back and wings with white underparts. The bill is long and pointed.  They have a small rounded black tail. The lower face becomes white in winter. This species produces a variety of harsh cackling calls at the breeding colonies, but is silent at sea.

They differ from the common murre in their thicker, shorter bill with white gape stripe and their darker head and back; the "bridled" morph is unknown in U. lomvia - a murre has either a white eye-stripe, or a white bill-stripe, or neither, but never both; it may be that this is character displacement, enabling individual birds to recognize conspecifics at a distance in the densely packed breeding colonies as the bridled morph is most common by far in North Atlantic colonies where both species of guillemots breed. In winter, there is less white on the thick-billed murre's face. They look shorter than the common murre in flight. First year birds have smaller bills than adults and the white line on the bill is often obscure, making the bill an unreliable way to identify them at this age. The head pattern is the best way to distinguish first-year birds from common murres.

Distribution

The thick-billed murre is distributed across the polar and sub-polar regions of the Northern Hemisphere where four subspecies exist; one lives on the Atlantic and Arctic oceans of North America (U. l. lomvia), another on the Pacific coast of North America (U. l. arra), and two others that inhabit the Russian arctic (U.l.eleonorae and U.heckeri).

Habitat 

Thick-billed murres spend all of their lives at sea in waters which remain below 8°C, except during the breeding season where they form dense colonies on cliffs.

Breeding

Thick-billed murres form vast breeding colonies, sometimes composed of over a million breeding birds, on narrow ledges and steep cliffs which face the water.
They have the smallest territory of any bird, requiring less than one square foot per individual. A breeding pair will lay a single egg each year. Despite this, they are one of the most abundant marine birds in the Northern Hemisphere.

Adults perform communal displays early in the breeding season to time their breeding cycles. They do not build nests, but lay the egg directly on bare rock. Both parents are involved in incubating the egg and raising the young. Due to the enormous amount of energy needed to take off in flight, adults can only provide one food item at a time to their chick. Chicks spend between 18 and 25 days on the cliffs before leaving for the sea.  Once ready to leave, the young will await nightfall and jump off the edge towards the water. A parent immediately jumps after and glides within centimeters of the fledgling. At sea, the male and the chick stay together for around 8 weeks during which the adult continues to provide food for the young.

Survival rates of the young is not based on the number of individuals in the colony, but rather on the age of the breeders within the colony. Offspring of inexperienced pairs grow more slowly than those of experienced breeders, possibly because they do not receive as much food from their parents. Also, pairs which contain at least one young breeding bird tend to have lower hatch rates.  Older and experienced adults obtain the better nesting sites located in the center of the colony, while the inexperienced individuals are kept on the margins where their young are more likely to be preyed upon.

Migratory patterns
They move south in winter into northernmost areas of the north Atlantic and Pacific, but only to keep in ice-free waters.

Flight and feeding characteristics

The thick-billed murre's flight is strong and direct, and they have fast wing beats due to the short wings. Like the other auks, these birds forage for food by using their wings to 'swim' underwater. They are accomplished divers, reaching depths of up to 150 m and diving for up to four minutes at a time; usually however birds make either shallow short dives or dive down to 21–40 m for longer periods. While hunting, the diving trajectory resembles a flattened 'U'. Birds will make long trips to get to favorite feeding grounds; while they usually forage several dozen km from their nest sites, they often travel more than 100 km to fish. The strong and direct flight of murres, which is, for their body size, the most costly form of sustained locomotion of any animal, is a result of their short wingspan

The diving depths and durations regularly achieved by these birds indicate that they, and similar auks, have some—as yet unknown—mechanism to avoid diving sickness and lung collapse when surfacing. It is postulated that auks temporarily absorb excess gases into the vascular structure of their bones. From there, it is gradually released from temporary storage in a controlled process of decompression.

Trophic linkages

The nominate race feeds primarily on fish such as Gadus spp. and Arctic cod (Boreogadus saida), as well as the pelagic amphipod Parathemisto libellula. Other fish such as capelin (Mallotus villosus) and Myoxocephalus spp., as well as other crustaceans, polychaetes, and a few molluscs, are found in their diet but in relatively low numbers. When wintering near Newfoundland, capelin can account for over 90 percent of their diet.

Thick-billed murres have few natural predators because the immense number of concentrated birds found on the breeding colonies and the inaccessibility of these breeding sites make it extremely difficult for them to be preyed upon. Their main predator is the glaucous gull (Larus hyperboreus), and these feed exclusively on eggs and chicks.  The common raven (Corvus corax) may also try to obtain eggs and hatchlings when they are left unattended.

Status and conservation

Although declines have been observed in many parts of their range, the thick-billed murre is not a species of concern as the total population is estimated to contain between 15 and 20 million individuals worldwide.

Egg harvesting and hunting of adult birds are major threats in Greenland, where populations fell steeply between the 1960s and 1980s. In the Barents Sea region, the species has declined locally, due to influences associated with polar stations in Russia. Fisheries may also be a threat, but because thick-billed murres are better able to use alternative food sources the effect of over-fishing is not as severe as on the common murre. Pollution from oil at sea exerts another major threat. Murres are among the seabirds most sensitive to oil contamination. Incidental mortality brought on by entanglement with fishing gear is also an important cause of population decline.

Thick-billed murres are closely associated with sea-ice throughout the year. Consequently, some scientists believe that climate change  may be a threat to this Arctic-breeding species. However the species seems adaptable. Populations at the southern edge of their range switched from feeding on ice-associated Arctic cod to warmer-water capelin as ice break-up became earlier. Dates for egg-laying advanced with the earlier disappearance of ice. The growth of chicks is slower in years when ice break-up is early relative to egg-laying by the murres. In extremely warm years, mosquitoes and heat kill some breeders.

As a vagrant
Brünnich's guillemot is a rare vagrant in European countries south of the breeding range. In Britain, over 30 individuals have been recorded, but over half of these were tideline corpses. Of those that were seen alive, only three have remained long enough to be seen by large numbers of observers. All three were in Shetland - winter individuals in February 1987 and November/December 2005, and a bird in an auk colony in summer 1989. The 1989 and 2005 birds were both found by the same observer, Martin Heubeck.

The species has been recorded once in Ireland, and has also been recorded in the Netherlands. In the western Atlantic, they may range as far as Florida, and in the Pacific to California. Before 1950, large numbers appeared on the North American Great Lakes in early winter, passing up the St. Lawrence River from the East coast. Such irruptions have not been seen since 1952.

Notes

References
 Bakken, Vidar & Pokrovskaya Irina V. (2000): Brünnich's Guillemot. In: Anker-Nilssen, T.; Bakken, Vidar; Strom, H.; Golovkin, A.N.; Bianki, V.V. & Tatarinkova, I.P. (eds.): The status of marine birds breeding in the Barents sea region. Norwegian Polar Institute Report Series 113: 119-124
 
 Evans, Peter, G.H & Kampp, K. (1991): Recent changes in Thick-billed Murre populations. In: Gaston, A.J & Elliot, R.D. (eds.): Studies of high-latitude seabirds: 2. Conservation biology of Thick-billed Murres in the Northwestern Atlantic. Canadian Wildlife Service Occasional Paper 69: 7–14.
 
 
 Gaston, Anthony J.; Nettleship, David N. (1981): The Thick-billed murres of Prince Leopold Island. Environment Canada, Ottawa. 
 Gaston, Anthony J.; Jones, Ian L. (1998): The Auks: Alcidae. Oxford University Press, Oxford. 
 Gaston, Anthony J. & Hipfner, J. Mark (2000): The Thick-billed Murre. The Birds of North America Inc., Philadelphia, PA. 
 
 
 
 Harrison, Peter (1988): Seabirds (2nd ed.). Christopher Helm, London. 
 Lilliendahl, K.; Solmundsson, J.; Gudmundsson, G.A. & Taylor, L. (2003): Can surveillance radar be used to monitor the foraging distribution of colonially breeding alcids? [English with Spanish abstract] Condor 105(1): 145–150. DOI: 10.1650/0010-5422(2003)105[145:CSRBUT]2.0.CO;2 HTML abstract
 National Geographic Society (2002): Field Guide to the Birds of North America. National Geographic, Washington DC. 
 Nettleship, David N. (1996): 3. Thick-billed Murre. In: del Hoyo, Josep; Elliott, Andrew & Sargatal, Jordi (eds.) (1996), Handbook of Birds of the World (Volume 3: Hoatzin to Auks): 710–711, plate 59. Lynx Edicions, Barcelona. 
 
 Sibley, David Allen (2000): The Sibley Guide to Birds. Alfred A. Knopf, New York.

External links

Atlantic auks
Birds of the Arctic
Birds of the Aleutian Islands
Guillemots
Uria
Thick-billed murre
Thick-billed murre
Holarctic birds